John Tom Atter (9 May 1901 – 6 October 1958) was an English professional footballer who played as a goalkeeper.

References

1901 births
1958 deaths
People from Dinnington, South Yorkshire
English footballers
Association football goalkeepers
Grimsby Town F.C. players
Rotherham United F.C. players
English Football League players